The 2015 Indonesia Super League, also known as QNB League for sponsorship reasons, was the seventh season of the top-flight Indonesian professional league for association football clubs since its establishment in 2008.

The season was planned to be started in February 2015. It was first officially announced that the 2015 Indonesia Super League would start on 1 February 2015, with verification process for the participants done in December 2014 but because of the reduction to participants to 18 teams, it was planned to start either on 21 or 22 February. After Minister of Youth and Sports Affairs, Imam Nahrawi, postponed the start of the season because of legal verifications reasons, on 23 February 2015, it was agreed that this season would start on 4 April 2015. The revised schedule was planned to end on 23 November 2015.

Persib were the defending champions. Pusamania Borneo joined as the promoted teams from the 2014 Liga Indonesia Premier Division. They replaced Persepam Madura United, Persita, Persijap, Persiba Bantul, and Persik who were relegated to the 2015 Liga Indonesia Premier Division.

The season would have some changes including the implementation of three different kick-off time for weekend matches, which are 15:30, 19:00 and 21:00. There would be also only two weekday matches scheduled.

This season was officially discontinued by PSSI on 2 May 2015 due to a ban by Imam Nahrawi, Minister of Youth and Sports Affairs, against PSSI to run any football competition.

Teams
Eighteen teams competed in the league – the 17 teams from the previous season and the one team promoted from the Premier Division. The new teams this season were Pusamania Borneo and Persiwa, who replaced Persepam Madura United, Persita, Persijap, and Persiba Bantul.

Persiwa and Persik were excluded before the season for failing to comply with financial and infrastructure requirements.

Name changes
 Putra Samarinda were renamed Bali United and relocated to Gianyar.

Stadiums and locations

Notes:

Personnel and kits
Note: Flags indicate national team as has been defined under FIFA eligibility rules. Players and coaches may hold more than one non-FIFA nationality.

Coaching changes

Foreign players
Football Association of Indonesia restricted the number of foreign players to three per team. A team can use all three foreign players at once.
 Players name in bold indicates the player was registered during the mid-season transfer window.
 Former Player(s) were players that out of squad or left club within the season, after pre-season transfer window, or in the mid-season transfer window, and at least had one appearance.

League table

Results

Season statistics

Top goalscorers

Hat-tricks

Discipline

 Most yellow card(s): 2
  Fabiano Beltrame (Arema Cronus)
  Jajang Mulyana (Mitra Kukar)
  Firly Apriansyah (Persebaya ISL)
  Boban Nikolić (Persipasi Bandung Raya)
  Sa Anun Al Qadry (Persiram)
  Saepulloh Maulana (Semen Padang)
 Most red card(s): 1
  Johan Alfarizi (Arema Cronus)
  Saša Zečević (Gresik United)
  Jajang Mulyana (Mitra Kukar)
  Valentino Telaubun (Persiba)

Attendances

See also
 2015 Liga Indonesia Premier Division
 2015 Piala Indonesia

References

 
2015

1
Indonesia